The Robert W. Scherer Power Plant (also known as Plant Scherer) is a coal-fired power plant in Juliette, Georgia, just north of Macon, Georgia, in the United States. The plant has four generating units, each capable of producing 930 megawatts, and is the most powerful coal-fired plant in North America. The plant is named after the former chairman and chief executive officer of Georgia Power.

Description
Each generating unit has a rated capacity of 945 megawatts, but produces 880 MW. The first unit was brought online in 1982. Additional units were brought online in 1984, 1987, and 1989.

It has two  chimney stacks, one built in 1982 and the second in 1986.

The plant's location is along the flight path of many commercial airline flights using Hartsfield-Jackson Airport in Atlanta, and is a prominent feature on the landscape, easily visible during daylight flights.

It was announced in June 2020 that Scherer will shut down Unit 4 by 2022 under an agreement reached by Florida Power & Light and the Jacksonville Electric Authority (JEA). In November 2021, Georgia Power announced that Unit 3 would also close, this time by year 2025.

Operator and ownership
The plant is operated by Georgia Power, a subsidiary of the Southern Company,
along with Oglethorpe Power Corporation, the city of Dalton, Georgia; NextEra Energy (through subsidiary Florida Power & Light); JEA of Jacksonville, Florida; and the Municipal Electric Authority of Georgia.

Coal trains 

The coal used at the Scherer plant comes from Wyoming's Powder River Basin, and is delivered by Norfolk Southern to the plant by BNSF unit trains of up to 135 cars. Currently, at least two and as many as five trains a day are unloaded at Plant Scherer. The trains use a hydraulic dump system and are unloaded from the bottom of the cars while passing over the unloading trestle. They do not stop while unloading, and are usually unloaded in around 90 minutes. Train ID numbers are usually NS 732-739. Trains get on Memphis District via BNSF and on Atlanta District in Chattanooga.

Emissions 
As of August 2012, Plant Scherer is under Georgia EPD investigation for coal ash pond leeching / drinking water contamination and air pollution / air quality. According to Natural History magazine,  Plant Scherer is the largest single point-source for carbon dioxide emissions in the United States.  It was also ranked 20th in the world in terms of carbon dioxide emissions by the Center for Global Development on its list of global power plants in November 2007.  It was the only power plant in the United States that was listed in the world's top 25 carbon dioxide producers.

Regulatory policies and institutions
Since 2009 Lisa Jackson, Director of the Environmental Protection Agency (EPA) proposed controversial rules and regulations which include the Utility Maximum Achievable Control Technology rule and the Cross-State Air Pollution Rule. Under CSAPR, non-complying plants like Scherer had only less than six months to implement required changes.

In 2011 Southern Company awarded KBR the contract for the installation of Plant Scherer's environmental compliance equipment, which included installation of flue-gas desulfurization and selective catalytic reduction equipment, related ductwork, and auxiliaries at two coal-fired units.

Notes

See also 

 List of largest power stations in the United States

References

External links
 http://www.skyscraperpage.com/diagrams/?b5480
 
 
 Data on generation and fuel consumption from the Energy Information Administration Electricity Data Browser

Towers completed in 1982
Towers completed in 1986
Towers in Georgia (U.S. state)
Buildings and structures in Monroe County, Georgia
Coal-fired power stations in Georgia (U.S. state)
Chimneys in the United States
Georgia Power
NextEra Energy
1982 establishments in Georgia (U.S. state)
Oglethorpe Power